is a railway station on the Tōkyū Den-en-toshi Line in Setagaya, Tokyo, Japan, operated by the private railway operator Tokyu Corporation.

Lines
Sakura-shimmachi Station is served by Tokyu Den-en-toshi Line. It lies 6.3 km from the starting point of the line at Shibuya Station in Tokyo.

Station layout
The station is an underground station with the concourse and ticket barriers located on the first basement ("B1F") level. There are two side platforms located above each other, with the down (for ) platform 1 on the second basement ("B2F") level, and the up (for ) platform 2 on the third basement ("B3F") level.

Platforms

History
Sakura-shimmachi Station opened on 7 April 1977.

Passenger statistics
In fiscal 2011, the station was used by an average of 65,618 passengers daily.

Surrounding area
The station is located on a commercial street a short walk from the residential area of Tsurumaki. Hasegawa Machiko Art Museum is located near this station.

References

External links
 Tokyu station information 

Railway stations in Tokyo
Tokyu Den-en-toshi Line
Stations of Tokyu Corporation
Railway stations in Japan opened in 1977